Shamsuzzaman Dudu is a Bangladesh Nationalist Party politician and the former Member of Parliament from Chuadanga-1. He is the vice-chairman of Bangladesh Nationalist Party. He studied at Dhaka University and now is a member of the Alumni Association.

Career
Dudu serves as the secretary of Jatiyatabadi Krishak Dal and as an adviser to Bangladesh Nationalist Party Chairperson Khaleda Zia. He was elected as an MP from Chuadanga-1 constituency at 1996.

References

External links

Bangladesh Nationalist Party politicians
Living people
7th Jatiya Sangsad members
Year of birth missing (living people)